A price channel is  a pair of parallel trend lines that form a chart pattern for a stock or commodity.  Channels may be horizontal, ascending or descending.  When prices pass through and stay through a trendline representing support or resistance, the trend is said to be broken and there is a "breakout".

References 

 John J. Murphy, Technical Analysis of the Financial Markets, New York Institute of Finance, 1999,

See also
Bollinger bands
Control chart
Donchian channel
Richard Donchian

Chart overlays